Niedziela is a Polish surname. Notable people with the surname include:

 Bartłomiej Niedziela (born 1985), Polish footballer
 Sebastian Niedziela (born 1975), Polish composer

See also
 

Polish-language surnames